Sultan Kudarat's 1st congressional district is one of the two congressional districts of the Philippines in the province of Sultan Kudarat. It has been represented in the House of Representatives since 2007. It was created after the 2006 reapportionment that divided the province into two congressional districts. The district is composed of the provincial capital, Isulan, its largest city, Tacurong, and the eastern municipalities of Columbio, Lambayong, Lutayan and President Quirino. It is currently represented in the 18th Congress by Bai Rihan M. Sakaluran of the National Unity Party (NUP).

Representation history

Election results

2019

2016

2013

2010

See also
Legislative districts of Sultan Kudarat

References

Congressional districts of the Philippines
Politics of Sultan Kudarat
2006 establishments in the Philippines
Congressional districts of Soccsksargen
Constituencies established in 2006